Mary Beard may refer to:

 Mary Beard (classicist) (born 1955), British classicist, literary critic and journalist
 Mary Beard (nursing) (1876–1946), director of the American Red Cross Nursing Service
 Mary Ritter Beard (1876–1958), American historian, author, women's suffrage activist